K'usilluni (Aymara k'usillu monkey, -ni a suffix to indicate ownership, "the one with a monkey (or monkeys)", also spelled Kusilluni) is a mountain in the eastern extensions of the Apolobamba mountain range in Bolivia, about  high. It is situated in the La Paz Department, Bautista Saavedra Province, Curva Municipality. K'usilluni lies northeast of the mountain Qutañani.

References 

Mountains of La Paz Department (Bolivia)